YLE24 was a Finnish language TV channel broadcast by Yle. The unit was founded in 2000, and it was active from 2001 to 2007.

See also 
 SVT24

External links 
 yle.fi/yle24

References

Yle television channels
Defunct television channels in Finland
Television channels and stations established in 2001
Television channels and stations disestablished in 2007